Alibek Osmonov (born 7 November 1996) is a Kyrgyzstani freestyle wrestler. He won one of the bronze medals in the men's 65 kg event at the 2021 World Wrestling Championships held in Oslo, Norway.

Career 

He won the silver medal in the men's 61 kg event at the 2017 Islamic Solidarity Games held in Baku, Azerbaijan. He also competed in the men's 61 kg event at the 2017 World Wrestling Championships held in Paris, France.

In 2018, he represented Kyrgyzstan at the Asian Games held in Indonesia and he competed in the men's 65 kg event.

He competed in the 65kg event at the 2022 World Wrestling Championships held in Belgrade, Serbia.

Achievements

References

External links 
 

Living people
1996 births
People from Talas, Kyrgyzstan
Kyrgyzstani male sport wrestlers
Islamic Solidarity Games medalists in wrestling
Islamic Solidarity Games competitors for Kyrgyzstan
Wrestlers at the 2018 Asian Games
Asian Games competitors for Kyrgyzstan
World Wrestling Championships medalists
20th-century Kyrgyzstani people
21st-century Kyrgyzstani people